The European Union of Music Competitions for Youth (EMCY) is a European umbrella organisation for about fifty national and international music competitions for young people. Founded in the 1960s in order to develop the musical education of young Europeans, EMCY arranges concerts (with and without orchestra), broadcasts, tours, award ceremonies, master classes and courses for competition prize winners throughout Europe.

Every year, thousands of musicians under the age of twenty-five take part in EMCY member competitions. EMCY is a registered association under German law with an elected international board of five representatives, headed since 2012 by chairman Paul Scholer. Its registered office is in Munich, Germany. In 2020 EMCY celebrated its 50th birthday. An anniversary brochure has been created to highlight the events from the last five decades.

EMCY board

The EMCY board is elected every four years at the general assembly. Current members are:

Paul Scholer, Luxembourg (president)
Mária Slaninová, Slovakia (vice president for national competitions)
, Lithuania (vice president for international competitions)
Àngels Civit Fons, Spain (board member for national competitions)
Boris Svetiev, Macedonia (board member for international competitions)

EMCY office

The EMCY office is located in Munich's Creative Quarter (Kreativquartier) in Schwere-Reiter-Str. 2B, 80637 Munich, Germany.

General assembly

The EMCY general assembly gathers, in general, every two years in a different European country at the invitation of an EMCY member competition. The last one was held in Luxembourg in 2018, hosted by the Concours Luxembourgeois pour Jeunes Solistes (UGDA).

General assemblies have been held in:
2002 – Altea (Spain): Juventudes Musicales de España
2004 – Dubrovnik (Croatia): HDGPP (Croatian national competition)
2006 – Saint Petersburg (Russia): Mravinsky International Competition for Youth
2008 – Kyiv (Ukraine): International Competition for Young Pianists in Memory of Vladimir Horowitz
2010 – Heerlen (Netherlands): International Charles Hennen Concours
2012 – Ohrid (Macedonia): International Competition for Young Musicians 'Ohrid Pearls'
2014 – Luxembourg: Concours Luxembourgeois pour Jeunes Solistes & European Competition for Young Soloists (and INTER-NATIONAL net_works+)
2016 – Vilnius (Lithuania): National Lithuanian Balys Dvarionas Piano & String Competition, the International Balys Dvarionas Competition for Young Pianists and the International Jascha Heifetz Competition for Violinists (and INTER-NATIONAL net_works+)
2018 – Luxembourg: Concours Luxembourgeois pour Jeunes Solistes & European Competition for Young Soloists (and INTER-NATIONAL net_works+)

Member competitions

National competitions

Participation in these competitions is usually reserved for nationals or residents of the respective country. This often includes schools abroad, students at conservatoires or ex-patriates, however.

 Österreichischer Jugendmusikwettbewerb prima la musica in Austria
 podium.jazz.pop.rock... in Austria
 The Papandopulo Croatian Competition of young musicians in Croatia
 National Radio Competition of the Czech Republic 'Concertino Praga' in the Czech Republic
 Oresund Soloist in Denmark / Sweden
 Concours d'excellence – Confédération Musicale de France in France
 Jugend musiziert in Germany
 National Balys Dvarionas Piano and String Competition in Lithuania
 Concours Luxembourgoise pour Jeunes Solistes (Union Grand-Duc Adolphe (UGDA)) in Luxembourg
 Competition of the United Music and Dance Teacher of Macedonia in Macedonia
 Netherlands Violin Competition in the Netherlands
 Ungdommens Musikkmesterskap (Norwegian Music Competition for Youth) in Norway
 Prémio Jovens Músicos in Portugal
 EMCY Slovakia in Slovakia
 TEMSIG – Slovenian Music Competition for Youth in Slovenia
 Concurso Juventudes Musicales in Spain
 SJMW Classica in Switzerland
 SJMW Jazz&Pop in Switzerland

International competitions

These competitions are open to participants from all over the world. Many include categories which change every year.
 International Competition Young Virtuosos in Sofia, Bulgaria
 International Radio Competition for Young Musicians 'Concertino Praga' in Prague, Czech Republic
 Smetana International Piano Competition in Plzeň, Czech Republic
 Aarhus International Piano Competition in Aarhus, Denmark
 International Competition of Young Pianists dedicated to the Work of F. Chopin in Narva, Estonia
 Anna Amalia Competition for Young Guitarists in Weimar, Germany
 Ettlingen International Competition for Young Pianists in Ettlingen, Germany
 International Competition for Violin, Kloster Schöntal in Schöntal, Germany
 International Franz Liszt Piano Competition in Weimar, Germany
 International Louis Spohr Competition for Young Violinists in Weimar, Germany
 Pianale International Academy and Competition in Schlitz, Germany
 International Balys Dvarionas Competition for Young Pianists and Violinists in Vilnius, Lithuania
 International Jascha Heifetz Competition for Violinists in Vilnius, Lithuania
 International Competition for Young Musicians 'Ohrid Pearls' in Ohrid, Macedonia
 International Competition for Young Pianists Artur Rubinstein in memoriam in Bydgoszcz, Poland
 International Competition for Young Pianists 'A Step Towards Mastery' in Saint Petersburg, Russia
 International Television Contest for Young Musicians 'Nutcracker' in Moscow, Russia
 Moscow International David Oistrakh Violin Competition in Moscow, Russia
 Mravinsky International Competition for Youth in Saint Petersburg, Russia
 Peter Toperczer International Piano Competition Košice in Košice, Slovakia
 International Competition for Young Pianists in memory of Vladimir Horowitz in Kyiv, Ukraine
 International Vladimir Krainev Young Pianists Competition in Kharkov, Ukraine
 Yehudi Menuhin International Competition for Young Violinists in the UK
International Competition “Glowing Harp”, Ukraine 
International Competition of Musical Art “Kharkiv Assemblies”, Ukraine 
Robert Schumann Competition for young pianists, Germany 
International piano competition of Orléans for youth ‘Brin d’herbe’, France

Projects

EMCY works to help prize winners in their musical and personal development. Performance and training opportunities throughout Europe are arranged by EMCY, together with its member competitions and partners. These concerts, tours, workshops, and master classes are international meeting points for young musicians.

EMCY also holds conferences for competition organisers (most recently in Luxembourg in 2018) and music educators on particular themes.

See also
 List of classical music competitions
 World Federation of International Music Competitions
 International Music Council, IMC

External links
 

Pan-European music organizations
Music organisations based in Germany
International organisations based in Germany
Youth music competitions